The Kingston Symphony Orchestra was a Canadian orchestra based in Kingston, Ontario that was active from 1914 to 1936. It was founded by composer and conductor Oscar Ferdinand Telgmann, who served as the ensembles only conductor. When he retired in 1936 the orchestra disbanded.

References

Canadian orchestras
Disbanded orchestras
Musical groups from Kingston, Ontario
Musical groups established in 1914
Musical groups disestablished in 1936
1914 establishments in Ontario
1936 disestablishments in Ontario